Christopher B. Coghlan (pronounced KAHG-lihn; born June 18, 1985) is an American former professional baseball outfielder. He played in Major League Baseball (MLB) for the Chicago Cubs, Florida / Miami Marlins, Oakland Athletics, and Toronto Blue Jays. Coghlan was the National League Rookie of the Year in 2009.

Career

High school and college
Coghlan attended East Lake High School in Tarpon Springs, Florida. He was selected by the Arizona Diamondbacks in the 18th round (546th overall) of the 2003 Major League Baseball draft, but did not sign, choosing instead to attend the University of Mississippi (Ole Miss) to play college baseball for the Ole Miss Rebels. In 2004, Coghlan started 54 games at third base and made the Southeastern Conference (SEC) All-Freshman team. He was named to the All-SEC second team in 2005. He played collegiate summer baseball for the Chatham A's of the Cape Cod Baseball League in 2005, was named a league all-star, and led the league in batting with a .346 average. In 2006, he was a first-team All-SEC and third-team All-American selection.

Coghlan was selected by the Florida Marlins in the first round (36th overall) of the 2006 Major League Baseball draft, and signed.

Florida/Miami Marlins
After joining the Marlins organization, Coghlan played for the Gulf Coast Marlins (Rookie level), the Jamestown Jammers (Low-A), the Greensboro Grasshoppers (A), the Jupiter Hammerheads (High-A), the Carolina Mudcats (Double-A) and the New Orleans Zephyrs (Triple-A).  Much of his time in the minors was spent switching positions from his college position of third base to second base and eventually left field when called up to the Florida Marlins.

Coghlan made his major league debut on May 8, . On August 9, 2009, he set the Marlins team record for consecutive multi-hit games at eight.

Coghlan had 41 hits in August 2009, the most for a rookie since Todd Helton hit 45 in August 1998, earning him Rookie of the Month honors. He then followed with 50 hits in September/October 2009, the first rookie with back to back 40+ hit months, and the first player to do so since Ichiro Suzuki in 2004. His .321 batting average was 6th in NL among all players and 1st among all rookies. After the MLB All-Star break, Coghlan led all major league players in batting average (.372) and hits (113).  His overall performance earned him the National League Rookie of the Year Award on November 16, 2009.

In April 2012, Coghlan was sent down to New Orleans, with Bryan Petersen being recalled to take his place. Coghlan was hitting .121 with a .299 OPS and 2 RBI in Miami. In May 2012, Coghlan and Donovan Solano were called up by the Marlins after Emillio Bonifacio was placed on the disabled list with a thumb injury. He started the same day against the Cleveland Indians going 0–4 with an RBI. In June 2012, Coghlan was sent down for a second time to the New Orleans Zephyrs to make room for Scott Cousins.

After the 2013 season, Coghlan was non-tendered by Miami, becoming a free agent.

Chicago Cubs

In January 2014, Coghlan signed a minor league deal including a spring training invitation with the Chicago Cubs. On May 3, the Cubs selected his contract from the Triple-A Iowa Cubs. He played in 125 games with the Cubs, switching between left and center field, with 385 at bats, hitting .283 with 9 home runs and 41 RBI's. He was most often used as a leadoff hitter and had an on-base percentage (OBP) of .352.

Oakland Athletics
On February 25, 2016, the Cubs traded Coghlan to the Oakland Athletics for right-handed pitcher Aaron Brooks. While with the A's Coghlan batted .146.

Second stint with the Chicago Cubs
On June 9, 2016, the Athletics traded Coghlan to the Cubs for Arismendy Alcántara. Coghlan played 48 games with the Cubs to finish 2016, batting .252 with a home run and 16 RBI. Overall in 2016, combined with both teams, Coghlan played 99 total games with a .188 average, six home runs, and 30 RBI. The Cubs finished the season with a 103–58 record, clinching the NL Central division. The Cubs would eventually win the World Series over the Cleveland Indians, ending their 108-year long drought.

Philadelphia Phillies
On February 2, 2017, Coghlan signed a minor league contract with the Philadelphia Phillies. He was released on March 28.

Toronto Blue Jays
On April 1, 2017, Coghlan signed a minor league contract with the Toronto Blue Jays, and was assigned to the Triple-A Buffalo Bisons. He was called up by the Blue Jays on April 14. On April 25, 2017, in a game against the St. Louis Cardinals, Coghlan scored a "play of the year" candidate by performing a dive roll over Cardinals' catcher Yadier Molina to avoid a tag and score a go-ahead run at the top of the seventh inning. Toronto won 6–5 in 11 innings. Coghlan was designated for assignment on August 12, and released on August 15.

Third stint with the Chicago Cubs
On March 29, 2018, Coghlan signed a minor league contract with the Chicago Cubs. He elected free agency on November 3, 2018.

Personal life
Coghlan married former The Bachelor season 14 contestant Corrie Adamson in 2011. His father Tim was killed in a traffic accident on June 5, 2001.

References

External links

1985 births
Águilas Cibaeñas players
American expatriate baseball players in the Dominican Republic
American expatriate baseball players in Canada
Baseball players from Miami
Buffalo Bisons (minor league) players
Carolina Mudcats players
Chatham Anglers players
Chicago Cubs players
Dunedin Blue Jays players
Florida Marlins players
Greensboro Grasshoppers players
Gulf Coast Marlins players
Iowa Cubs players
Jamestown Jammers players
Jupiter Hammerheads players
Living people
Major League Baseball Rookie of the Year Award winners
Miami Marlins players
New Orleans Zephyrs players
Oakland Athletics players
Ole Miss Rebels baseball players
People from Palm Harbor, Florida
Peoria Saguaros players
Sportspeople from the Tampa Bay area
Tennessee Smokies players
Toronto Blue Jays players